The Chinese Xiangqi Association was founded in 1962 as a member of the All-China Sports Federation promoting xiangqi, or Chinese chess, and is based in Beijing.  It is among the founding members of the Asian Xiangqi Federation, and since 1975 has been a member of the International Xiangqi Federation. In addition to organising and hosting xiangqi tournaments, it is responsible for publishing approximately 95% of xiangqi books and other publications on the subject in China.

External links
Chinese Xiangqi Association (official website)
World Xiangqi Federation

References

Members of the All-China Sports Federation
Xiangqi
Chess in China
Sports organizations established in 1962
1962 establishments in China